Robert Pulfer (born 2 October 1967) is a Canadian former cyclist. He competed in the team time trial event at the 1984 Summer Olympics.

References

External links
 

1967 births
Living people
Canadian male cyclists
Olympic cyclists of Canada
Cyclists at the 1984 Summer Olympics
Sportspeople from Vernon, British Columbia
Sportspeople from British Columbia